Cyclophyllum  longipetalum, known as the Coast Canthium is a shrub or tree occurring in eastern Australia. Commonly seen growing in a variety of different rainforest situations. From Lake Conjola in southern New South Wales to Fraser Island in south eastern Queensland.

Description 
Occasionally growing to tree size, the tallest trees are 25 metres tall and with a 50 cm trunk diameter. Often seen as a shrub growing at the edge of the eucalyptus rainforest ecotone.

The trunk is mostly straight, though sometimes buttressed at the base on larger trees. Bark is grey or brown,  with some wrinkles, cracks or fissures. Small branches fairly thick, usually four angled (square in cross section).

Leaves 

Leaves opposite on the stem, smooth edged without leaf serrations. 2 to 10 cm long, 1 to 4 cm wide. Leaf venation not particularly obvious on the upper side of the leaf. Leaves sometimes show foveolae at the leaf axils. That is (raised bumps where the lateral leaf veins branch off from the main leaf mid vein). Net veins not seen.

Flowers & fruit 

Fragrant creamy golden brown flowers form from January to March. The fruit is a fleshy orange/red drupe, around 10 mm long. Seen from October to January. Within the fruit are often two seeds, one each within the two lobes of the hard capsule, surrounded by the glossy red aril.

References

 
 

longipetalum
Flora of New South Wales
Flora of Queensland
Trees of Australia
Taxa named by Sally T. Reynolds
Taxa named by Rodney John Francis Henderson